Martin de Vries (born 7 April 1960) is a Dutch former professional basketball player. After playing eight seasons for Donar, his jersey number 10 was retired by the club. 

De Vries started playing for Donar in 1979, at age 19. From 1983 to 1986, he played for BV Orca's and Hatrans Haaksbergen.

He also played 27 games for the Netherlands men's national basketball team.

From 2013 to 2022, De Vries was the technical director of Donar.

Career statistics

Eredivisie 

Source: Basketball Nederland.
|-
| style="text-align:center;" colspan="2"|Career
| 286 ||  || 10.4 || .492 || .498 || .779 || 1.6 || 1.3 || 0.7 || 0.1 || 15.5

References 

1960 births
Living people
Donar (basketball club) players
Dutch Basketball League players
Dutch men's basketball players
Shooting guards
Sportspeople from Groningen (city)